The 1996 Volvo Women's Open was a women's tennis tournament played on outdoor hard courts in Pattaya in Thailand that was part of Tier IV of the 1996 WTA Tour. It was the sixth edition of the tournament and was held from 18 November through 24 November 1996. First-seeded Ruxandra Dragomir won the singles title.

Finals

Singles

 Ruxandra Dragomir defeated  Tamarine Tanasugarn 7–6, 6–4
 It was Dragomir's 3rd singles title of the year and of her career.

Doubles

 Miho Saeki /  Yuka Yoshida defeated  Tina Križan /  Nana Miyagi 6–2, 6–3
 It was Saeki's 2nd title of the year and the 3rd of her career. It was Yoshida's only title of the year and the 2nd of her career.

References

External links
 ITF tournament edition details
 Tournament draws

 
 WTA Tour
 in women's tennis
Tennis, WTA Tour, Volvo Women's Open
Tennis, WTA Tour, Volvo Women's Open

Tennis, WTA Tour, Volvo Women's Open